Doğan Babacan (30 November 1929 – 18 May 2018) was a Turkish football referee. He was the first Turkish referee to supervise a match in FIFA World Cup history.

Babacan was born in Istanbul. He played football for Beşiktaş JK, Karşıyaka S.K., Kasımpaşa S.K. and Hacettepe. His career as a referee began in 1955 and he was placed on FIFA's Referees List in 1968. He is known for supervising the first round Group 1 match between West Germany and Chile in the 1974 FIFA World Cup. In that match, Babacan sent off Chilean Carlos Caszely. It was the first red card in World Cup history. On 10 April 1974 he sent off three Atlético Madrid players in the first leg of the European Cup semi-final match against Celtic in Glasgow.

Later he was referee for the 1975 UEFA Super Cup final between FC Bayern Munich and FC Dynamo Kyiv. He retired from international refereeing in 1978.

He died on 18 May 2018, aged 88.

References

1929 births
2018 deaths
Turkish football referees
FIFA World Cup referees
1974 FIFA World Cup referees
Sportspeople from Istanbul
Olympic football referees